Jozef Dobrotka (born October 23, 1952) is a Slovak former handball player who competed for Czechoslovakia in the 1976 Summer Olympics.

He was born in Bojnice.

In 1976 he was part of the Czechoslovak team which finished seventh in the Olympic tournament. He played all five matches and scored nine goals.

External links
 profile

1952 births
Living people
Czechoslovak male handball players
Slovak male handball players
Olympic handball players of Czechoslovakia
Handball players at the 1976 Summer Olympics
Sportspeople from Bojnice